FRLA may refer to:

Fritz Reuter Literary Archive, an institution in Berlin, Germany that collects autographs and manuscripts by 19th century authors from Mecklenburg
Federal Regulation of Lobbying Act of 1946, a statute enacted by the United States Congress to reduce the influence of lobbyists
Frederick Law Olmsted National Historic Site,  a United States National Historic Site located in Brookline, Massachusetts
Florida Restaurant and Lodging Association